Herbert Ernest Gregory (1869–1952) was a Yale University geologist well known for his early 20th-century explorations of the Colorado Plateau in Arizona and Utah. One of his most important works is Colorado Plateau Region, published by the United States Geological Survey on the occasion of the United States sponsoring the 16th International Geological Congress.

Gregory was a student at Harvard University of American geographer William Morris Davis. He was the director of the geology department at Yale University, where he worked to expand the department to include a human geography emphasis. From 1919 to 1936 he served as director of the Bishop Museum in Hawaii, where, in 1961, after his death, he was honored by a medal named after him. The Herbert E. Gregory Medal is awarded every four years to a leading scientist in the Pacific Region.

His seminal work included mapping much of the bedrock geology of the Colorado Plateau, particularly in geologic monographs concentrating on what is now the Navajo Nation in northeastern Arizona and southeastern Utah.  Among many other achievements, he was the first to name and describe the Upper Triassic Chinle Formation, which is famous for preserving extensive fossil evidence of Late Triassic terrestrial ecosystems, including fossilized logs.

In 1931, Gregory published the first geologic map of the Grand Staircase–Escalante National Monument.  Gregory stated that no fossils had been discovered; however, many were later found.

References

1869 births
1952 deaths
American geologists
American geographers
Harvard University alumni
Presidents of the American Association of Geographers
Bishop Museum